These are the results of the men's horizontal bar competition, one of seven events for male competitors of the artistic gymnastics discipline contested in the gymnastics at the 2010 Summer Youth Olympics in Singapore. The qualification and final rounds took place on 16 August at the Bishan Sports Hall.

Medalists

Results

Qualification

41 gymnasts competed in the floor exercise event in the artistic gymnastics qualification round on August 16.
The eight highest scoring gymnasts advanced to the final on August 22.

Final

References
Men's Horizontal Bar Final Results

Gymnastics at the 2010 Summer Youth Olympics